The men's Greco-Roman bantamweight was a Greco-Roman wrestling event held as part of the Wrestling at the 1924 Summer Olympics programme. It was the first appearance of the event. Bantamweight was the lightest category, including wrestlers weighing up to 58 kilograms.

Results
Source: Official results; Wudarski

The tournament was double-elimination.

First round

Second round

25 wrestlers began this round.  In the 12 matches, 8 wrestlers suffered their second loss in this round and were eliminated.  4 wrestlers suffered their first loss.  9 wrestlers continued undefeated, while 3 won whilst avoiding elimination and a further one-loss wrestler received a bye.

Third round

9 wrestlers began this round with no losses, 8 with one loss.

5 wrestlers suffered their second loss in this round and were eliminated (including Gundersen, who withdrew). 5 wrestlers continued undefeated, 3 won whilst avoiding elimination, and 4 suffered their first loss.

Fourth round

5 wrestlers began this round with no losses, 7 with one loss.

Of the 6 matches, one pitted undefeated wrestlers against each other.  Two involved two wrestlers who each had one loss.  The remaining three were contested by an undefeated wrestler against one facing elimination, resulting in one elimination and two men receiving their first loss.

This resulted in 2 wrestlers keeping their undefeated status and 3 being eliminated.  3 men received their first loss and 4 won while avoiding elimination.

Fifth round

2 wrestlers began this round with no losses, 7 with one loss (6 after Dierickx withdrew).

Of the four matches, two involved both wrestlers facing elimination and two pitted an undefeated wrestler against a man with one loss.  The latter two resulted in one elimination and one wrestler taking his first loss.  In all, 4 wrestlers (including Dierickx) were eliminated.  One wrestler continued undefeated, one had his first loss, and three survived elimination.

Sixth round

1 wrestler began this round with no losses, 4 with one loss (3 after Herschmann withdrew).

One match was certain elimination, while the other pitted the undefeated Pütsep against the one-loss Hansson. Pütsep defeated Hansson to remain undefeated, while Ahlfors survived elimination by eliminating Ikonen.

This round was the last.  Pütsep, who had defeated Ahlfors already, won the gold.  Ahlfors placed second.  Ikonen took bronze over Hansson based on number of wins, as Ikonen had advanced without a bye while Hansson had received a bye.

References

Wrestling at the 1924 Summer Olympics